Wikelman Carmona (born 24 February 2003) is a Venezuelan professional footballer who plays as a midfielder for Major League Soccer club New York Red Bulls.

Career

Early life
Born in Valle de la Pascua, Carmona began his football career in 2016 at the Academia Dynamo FC on Margarita Island.

New York Red Bulls
On 25 January 2021, Carmona signed with Major League Soccer club New York Red Bulls. During the season, Carmona was loaned out to New York Red Bulls II, making his debut on 30 April 2021, starting in a 3–2 loss to Hartford Athletic. Carmona was recalled to the first team and on 17 April 2021, Carmona made his first-team debut, appearing in the second half in a 2–1 loss to Sporting Kansas City. On 31 July 2021, Carmona scored his first goal as a professional in a 2-3 loss to New England Revolution.

Carmona missed several months at the start of the 2022 season due to injury. Upon return, he was sent on loan to New York Red Bulls II. 
He scored his first goal in the USL Championship on 20 August 2022, in the 2-2 draw against Pittsburgh Riverhounds. He made his return to the first team on 31 August 2022, playing 20 minutes versus CF Montréal in a 1-0 victory.

International
Carmona was a member of the Venezuela U17 team during the 2019 South American U-17 Championship in Peru, scoring in a 5–3 victory against Bolivia.

Career statistics

References

External links 

2003 births
Living people
Venezuelan footballers
Venezuelan expatriate footballers
Venezuelan expatriate sportspeople in the United States
New York Red Bulls players
Association football midfielders
Major League Soccer players
Venezuela youth international footballers
People from Valle de la Pascua